The 2007 season of the Polish American Football League (PLFA) was the 2nd season played by the major american football league in Poland. Regular season play was held from April 14 to September 23, 2007. The Polish champion title was eventually won by The Crew Wrocław when they defeated the AZS Silesia Miners; the Polish Bowl championship game, at Marymont stadium in Warsaw, Masovian Voivodeship on October 14.

Regular season

Northern Division

Central Division

Southern Division

Playoffs 
Three division winners and one runner-up was qualify to the play-offs.

Bracket

Semi-finals 
 September 22, Sopot
 Seahawks vs. The Crew 2:18
 September 30, Żyrardów
 Eagles vs. Miners 13:16

Polish Bowl II 
 October 14, 2006
 Warsaw
 Marymont stadium
 Attendance: ?
 MVP: Paweł Wojcieszak (The Crew)

See also 
 2007 in sports

References

External links 
 Polish American Football Association

Polish American Football League seasons
Poland
Plfa Season, 2007